The Couvent des Bernardines is a historic building in the 1st arrondissement of Marseille, France. It was a Roman Catholic convent for the Bernardines from its construction in 1743 to the French Revolution. It has been home to a high school, the Lycée Thiers, since 1802. It has been a listed building since 1952.

References

Religious buildings and structures completed in 1743
Cistercian nunneries in France
Monuments historiques of Marseille